Beni-Dibele Airport  is an airport serving Bena Dibele, a town on the Sankuru River in Sankuru Province, Democratic Republic of the Congo.

See also

 Transport in the Democratic Republic of the Congo
 List of airports in the Democratic Republic of the Congo

References

External links
 OpenStreetMap - Beni-Dibele Airport
 OurAirports - Beni-Dibele Airport
 FallingRain - Beni-Dibele Airport
 HERE Maps - Beni-Dibele Airport

Airports in Sankuru